Rukhsana Jamshed Buttar is a Pakistani politician who served as member of the National Assembly of Pakistan.

Political career
She was elected to the National Assembly of Pakistan as a candidate of Pakistan Muslim League (Q) on a seat reserved for women from Punjab in 2012. She served as Federal Parliamentary Secretary for Petroleum and Natural Resources.

References

Pakistani MNAs 2008–2013
Living people
Year of birth missing (living people)